The fifth season of the stop-motion television series Robot Chicken originally aired in the United States on Cartoon Network's late night programming block, Adult Swim. Season five officially began on December 12, 2010, on Adult Swim, with "Robot Chicken's DP Christmas Special", and contained a total of twenty episodes.

The show was filmed in 16:9 widescreen starting this season.

This is the last season to be co-produced by ShadowMachine Films, Sony Pictures Digital, and Cartoon Network Productions, and the last to be streamed censored on HBO Max before it went without the bleeps starting with Season 6.

Overview 
The fifth season of Robot Chicken includes many TV, movie, commercial, pop culture parodies, all acted out by dolls and action figures, including parodies like: the creators imagine what Batman and Robin think about their Christmas jingle - hint: don't sing it if you value your life; what Skeletor is forced to do when Snake Mountain is foreclosed on; Gargamel puts himself in a Smurf body to gain the trust of the village; Major Nelson uses Jeannie to get back at NASA for firing him, NASA's Lego people have a very bad launch day, The creators imagine how Cabbage Patch Kids are made, The Keebler Elves go to war against the Cookie Monster, Strawberry Shortcake attempts to name Baby Needs-a-Name, A group of mentally challenged soldiers take on Hitler and the SS, The Joker finally gets what coming to him, Optimus Prime chooses his kick-ass name, what Eternia's 24-hour gym might be like, Princess Peach's parents react when they first met Mario, Winnie the Pooh's addiction, Superman tries to escape Lois' nagging, Doc Brown obtains plutonium, Dora the Explorer embarks on a dangerous Mt. Everest excursion, A bunch of Spocks from the future gather for a surprise party, A lost The Lord of the Rings manuscript gets finished by Tolkien's 6-year-old grandson, and Sex and the City 3 tries to be more guy-oriented.

The fifth-season finale celebrates the show's 100th episode, featuring an alternate storyline, in which the Robot Chicken from the show's opening sequence is accidentally freed from the chair by the castle maid and escapes the Mad Scientist's lair. When RC returns home, he comes to find that his house has been broken into and discovers that his wife has been kidnapped by the Mad Scientist and is being forced to take his place in the chair. RC is then forced to return to the Mad Scientist's castle and battle his way through a series of Robot Chicken characters before finally meeting his maker in a final battle for his wife.

Guest stars 
Many celebrities have guest starred in Robot Chicken season five; they include Mila Kunis, Sarah Michelle Gellar, Macaulay Culkin, Seth MacFarlane, Sasha Barrese, Clare Grant, Michael Ian Black, Katee Sackhoff, Christian Slater, Fred Tatasciore, Dave Sheridan, Michelle Trachtenberg, Abraham Benrubi, Eden Espinosa, Alyson Hannigan, Chris Parnell, Skeet Ulrich, Tamara Garfield, Olivia Munn, Alan Tudyk, Lea Thompson, Sean Astin, Donald Faison, Katy Mixon, Andy Richter, Marc Summers, Amy Smart, Rove McManus, Adrianne Palicki, Pete Wentz, Kevin Bacon, Gary Coleman (final role before his death), Kyle Chandler, Elijah Wood, J.K. Simmons, Harland Williams, Amy Brenneman, Emma Stone, Diablo Cody, Kristen Bell, Nathan Fillion, Jennifer Field, Stuart Townsend, Bryan Cranston, Megan Fox, Brian Austin Green, Sam Kwasman, Josh Groban, Mark Hamill, Katelin Peterson, Freddie Prinze Jr., Zachary Gordon, Laura Ortiz, Magda Apanowicz, Quinton Flynn, Alison Brie, Stephen Stanton, Tisha Campbell-Martin, Mae Whitman, Christopher McCulloch, Jeri Ryan, Dana Daurey, Jon Hamm, Patrick Stump, Jeremy Renner, Affion Crockett, Christopher Lloyd, Jena Malone, Rachael Leigh Cook, Rachael MacFarlane and Frank Welker.

Episodes

DVD release

References 

2010 American television seasons
2011 American television seasons
2012 American television seasons
Robot Chicken seasons